The 1918 Iowa State Cyclones football team represented Iowa State College of Agricultural and Mechanic Arts (later renamed Iowa State University) in the Missouri Valley Conference during the 1918 college football season. In their fourth season under head coach Charles Mayser, the Cyclones compiled a 0–3 record and were outscored by opponents by a combined total of 38 to 0. Due to events related to World War I and the 1918 flu pandemic, the Missouri Valley Conference did not schedule any official conference games, recorded no standings, and awarded no title for 1918. The 1918 Iowa State team played their home games at State Field in Ames, Iowa. V.A. “Chick” Heater was the team captain.

Schedule

References

Iowa State
Iowa State Cyclones football seasons
College football winless seasons
Iowa State Cyclones football